Enzo Artoni and Ignacio González King were the defending champions, but did not compete this year.

Daniel Köllerer and Oliver Marach defeated Lucas Arnold Ker and Giovanni Lapentti 6–4, 6–3 in the final.

Seeds

  Lucas Arnold Ker /  Giovanni Lapentti (final)
  Rubén Ramírez Hidalgo /  Santiago Ventura (first round)
  Marcelo Melo /  Sergio Roitman (quarterfinals)
  Marcos Daniel /  Fernando Vicente (withdrew due to a back injury for Daniel)

Draw

Draw

External links
Main Draw

2005 Doubles